
Gmina Nowy Żmigród is a rural gmina (administrative district) in Jasło County, Subcarpathian Voivodeship, in south-eastern Poland.

Villages
Gmina Nowy Żmigród contains the villages and settlements of Brzezowa, Desznica, Gorzyce, Grabanina, Jaworze, Kąty, Łężyny, Łysa Góra, Makowiska, Mytarka, Mytarz, Nienaszów, Nowy Żmigród, Sadki, Siedliska Żmigrodzkie, Skalnik, Sośniny, Stary Żmigród and Toki.

Neighbouring gminas
Gmina Nowy Żmigród is bordered by the gminas of Brzyska, Chorkówka, Dębowiec, Dukla, Krempna, Osiek Jasielski and Tarnowiec.

References
Polish official population figures 2006

Nowy Zmigrod
Jasło County